Forever Young is an album by Norwegian guitarist and composer Jacob Young released on the ECM label in 2014.

Reception

The Allmusic review by Thom Jurek states: "Young's playing throughout offers great technical facility, but he is a democratic bandleader, never showy. Forever Young stands out in his catalog because it reveals an almost immeasurable growth in his compositional skills since 2007. These tunes inspire this fine band; they play as if they'd been playing them for ages". In JazzTimes John Murph wrote: "The airy arrangements afford Young plenty of room to showcase his comely, full-bodied sound and his effortless manner of unraveling melodically cogent improvisations. His gifts as a composer are on full display as well, and he demonstrates an intriguing way of enveloping pop and rock motifs into soft-hued modern jazz". On All About Jazz John Kelman noted "Forever Young demonstrates an ability to simmer in a way that his previous ECM recordings did not. It also represents a first outing by a quintet with plenty of potential; hopefully six years won't have to pass before this intimate yet delicately expressionistic quintet can once again reconvene".

Track listing 
All compositions by Jacob Young.

 "I Lost My Heart to You" - 8:29
 "Therese's Gate" - 6:44
 "Bounce" - 7:46
 "We Were Dancing" - 5:52
 "Sofia's Dance" - 7:33
 "Comeback Girl" - 7:01
 "1970" - 6:34
 "Beauty" - 6:11
 "Time Changes" - 9:32
 "My Brother"- 7:43

Personnel 
Jacob Young - guitar 
Trygve Seim - tenor saxophone, soprano saxophone
Marcin Wasilewski - piano
 Slawomir Kurkiewicz - bass 
Michal Miskiewicz - drums

Production and design
Engineered by Jan Erik Kongshaug 
Design by Sascha Kleis
Liner photos by Summer Krinsky
Produced by Manfred Eicher

References 

ECM Records albums
Jacob Young (musician) albums
2014 albums
Albums produced by Manfred Eicher